Rockland is a bilingual community located about  east of downtown Ottawa, Ontario, Canada, part of the city of Clarence-Rockland. Rockland has a population of 26,505 (2021). It is home to a large part of the francophone community in Eastern Ontario along with the towns situated to the east and the Ottawa suburb of Orleans to the west.

History

The Clarence region began growing in 1840 with the development of the road to l'Orignal-Bytown. Before then, farmers relentlessly cleared wooded space to be able to cultivate land, their only means of survival. In 1868, a young entrepreneur, William Cameron Edwards, decided to establish a sawmill at the McCaul point. The opening of a link to the Grand Trunk Railway followed in 1888 to allow wood and merchandise to be transported. Edwards, who held timber rights in the area and was also the first postmaster, named the area for the rocky nature of its landscape.  The post office dates from 1869.

In 1889, the mission served by the priest Caron from Clarence-Creek became a parish. The first priest of the new parish was Siméon Hudon, native of Québec City. The first school opened in 1875 while the first high-school opened in 1905.

Construction of a second railroad in 1908 linking Ottawa and Hawkesbury greatly promoted population. In effect, for 75 cents (return) people could go to Ottawa to run errands and return in the same day. The woodmill owned by W. C. Edwards closed in 1926, as a result of the economic turmoil following the First World War. A large part of the population moved to the province of Quebec to find employment in the woodmills in Hull and Gatineau. Economic recovery began in 1939 with the start of the Second World War, and the return of soldiers after the war brought an increase in population. Construction of homes increased rapidly creating a need for expanded water services, electricity and a sewer system implemented in 1964.

Throughout the 1970s, Rockland was a small community with a population of about 3,500 people. Since the turn of the millennium, it has seen rapid growth in housing development. Prior to 2000, the number of new homes built were below 60 or 70 annually, but in the period between 2000 and 2010, the total number of new homes built was 2185.

Commercial expansion
Rockland is a rapidly growing community, and is constantly adding new retailers and businesses to service the community.

Rockland has local outlets of major chains like A&W, Boston Pizza, Tim Hortons, Canadian Tire, Subway, Dollarama, Food Basics, Giant Tiger, Home Hardware, Your Independent Grocer, Liquor Control Board of Ontario (LCBO), McDonald's, Mark's Work Wearhouse, 2Networkit.com Inc., Shoppers Drug Mart, SonXPlus, Roch Drouin Auto Repair, St-Hubert, Gabriel's Pizza, POP Shoes, RE/MAX, TSC and Walmart.

Leisure
Rockland is home to a newly constructed  Recreation Centre.  The centre houses the Rockland Library, the largest YMCA in the Ottawa area (with indoor swimming pool, state-of-the-art gymnasium, numerous children's/youth/family/senior programs) and theatre.

On July 8, 2009, the Canadian and Ontario governments jointly announced funding for the construction of a new sporting event and training center in Rockland. The centre will help meet the sports and recreational needs of the City of Clarence-Rockland and Eastern Ontario by providing two NHL-size ice surfaces, two soccer fields, a baseball diamond and a running track, as well as enhance the level of recreational tourism in the region.  The multi-use facility will also allow for the creation of an advanced hockey program for secondary-school level hockey players and used as a national training facility for Hockey Canada.

The semi-private Outaouais Golf Club has courses that are considered among the highest rated in the National Capital Region. Canadian Professional Golfers Association (CPGA) professionals are onsite to provide lessons, and practice sessions are also available to all golfers.

Education
There are a variety of schools in Rockland including Anglophone public, Francophone public, Anglophone Catholic, and Francophone Catholic.

Elementary
 Rockland Public School (RKPS)
 St. Patrick Catholic Elementary School
 École élémentaire catholique Sainte-Trinité
 École Carrefour Jeunesse

High school
 École secondaire catholique L'Escale
 Rockland District High School (RDHS)
 St. Francis Xavier Catholic High School (St. FX) located in Hammond but attended by many students from Rockland
 Canadian International Hockey Academy

Adult
 Eastern Ontario Education and Training Centre

Music
 Rockland Music School
 Domenic's Academy of Music

Transportation

The community is served by Prescott-Russell Road 17, a two-lane road that by-passes the centre of the community to its north, though multiple businesses including big-box stores have been built along the roadway over the past several years. Heading west, it becomes Ottawa Road 174 heading towards Orleans and downtown Ottawa via Highway 417. Eastward it connects to municipalities such as Wendover, Alfred, Plantagenet and Hawkesbury. Prior to the downgrading of multiple roads across the province by the Ontario government during the 1990s, it was known as Ontario Highway 17 east of the Highway 417 and 174 split. During the past several years, there have been calls to widen Highway 174 between Trim Road and Rockland although the city of Ottawa had previously refused funding for the highway. However, some Ottawa councillors as well as the federal government have expressed support for the widen due to safety reasons and multiple fatal crashes.

The community is also served by a commuter bus line operated by Leduc Bus Lines which offers 10–12 trips from the village to downtown Ottawa and Gatineau during rush hour.

The community of Rockland wishes to establish OC Transpo connections by the end of 2015 in hopes of exchanging Ottawa city culture with the rural French community that inhabits Rockland. As of December 2021, this connection has not been established.

References

Former towns in Ontario
Communities in the United Counties of Prescott and Russell
Clarence-Rockland